This is a list of deputy speakers of the Regional Representative Council, the upper house of Indonesia. This list includes preceding bodies, such as the deputy speaker of the Senate of the United States of Indonesia.

Preceding bodies

Deputy Speaker of the Senate of the United States of Indonesia

Deputy speakers of the Regional Representative Council

See also 
 Regional Representative Council
 List of speakers of the Regional Representative Council of Indonesia

Bibliography

References 

Lists of political office-holders in Indonesia